Teško meni sa tobom (a još teže bez tebe) (trans. It's hard with you (even harder without you)) is the second studio album released by the former Yugoslavia's Merlin band. The album was released in 1986. The album-cover is inspired by the iconic photograph Kozarčanka.

Track listing

Personnel
Artwork by  Trio 
Executive producer – Vetko Šalaka 
Performers (Band members) – Dino Dervišhalidović, Džaf Saračević, Mensur Lutvica, Enver "Mili" Milišić, Tula Bjelanović
Performers (Special guests) – Damir Arslanagić, Goran Bregović, Igor Ivanović, Mladen V. - Tifa, Saša Strunjaš, Zlatan Čeha
Producer – Likić B. 
Producer, recorded by Neno Jeleč

External links
Teško meni sa tobom (a još teže bez tebe) on Dino Merlin's official web site
Teško Meni Sa Tobom, A Još Teže Bez Tebe on Discogs

Dino Merlin albums
1986 albums